The 1946–47 Swedish Division I season was the third season of Swedish Division I. Hammarby IF defeated Sodertalje SK in the league final, 2 games to none.

Regular season

Northern Group

Southern Group

Final
Hammarby IF – Södertälje SK 7–4, 4–2

External links
 1946–47 season

Swedish Division I seasons
1